Carlos Martínez Gorriarán is a Spanish scholar, born in San Sebastián, Basque Country, Spain. After being a member of marxist and basque nationalist movements, he became one of the founding members and spokespersons of ¡Basta Ya! association and head of the Plataforma Pro from which the Union, Progress and Democracy (UPyD) party emerged in September 2007. In ¡Basta Ya! he was opposed to ETA, and also to the "obligatory nationalism" that he considered to be occurring in the Basque Country. He is a member of the Directing and Political counsels of the party.

He is a philosophy teacher in the Basque Country University. Since the 2011 Spanish General Election, he has been a deputy in the Spanish Congress representing the UPyD in Madrid Province.

Works 
 Movimientos cívicos (Turpial, 2008).
 Casa, provincia, rey: (para una historia de la cultura del poder en el Pais Vasco), (Alberdania, 1993).
 El arte vasco y el problema de la identidad, (Alberdania, 1995), (In collaboration with Imanol Agirre Arriaga).
 Oteiza, un pensamiento sin domesticar: ensayo, (San Sebastián; Baroja, D.L. 1989).

Reviews 
 Un libro de excepción, a review of Porque tengo hijos by Rosa Díez.

Collaborations in collective works 
 Fernando Savater y su obra: una actualización fundamental de la filosofía
 en la obra Libertad de filosofar: ética, política y educación en la obra de Fernando Savater / coord. por Francisco Giménez Gracia, Enrique Ujaldón Benítez, 2007, pags. 119-144
 La crisis de la cultura en la época de la globalización
 en la obra Los temas de nuestro tiempo / coord. por Fernando García de Cortázar Ruiz de Aguirre, 2002, pags. 115-140
 Sobre los orígenes y lógica del terrorismo en el País Vasco
 en la obra Nacionalismo: pasado, presente y futuro / coord. por Antonio Hernández, Javier Espinosa, 2000, pags. 99-114

Magazine articles 
 Los Relatos de kolymá, de Varlam Shalámov: la tensión entre literatura y testimonio (sobre las propiedades cognitivas de la narración)
 en Enrahonar: Quaderns de filosofía, Nº 38-39, 2007, pags. 101-115
 El terrorismo etarra: un final confuso
 en Noticiero de las ideas, Nº. 25, 2006, pags. 72-80
 Thoreau, una vida bella y libre
 en Revista de Libros, Nº. 103-104, 2005, pags. 45-46
 Los movimientos cívicos vascos frente a ETA
 en Claves de la razón práctica, Nº 147, 2004, pags. 28-37
 Sobre la interpretación y la verdad en la filosofía contemporánea (I)
 en Bitarte: Revista cuatrimestral de humanidades, Año 11, Nº. 32, 2004, pags. 73-101
 Sobre la interpretación y la verdad en la filosofía contemporánea (y II)
 en Bitarte: Revista cuatrimestral de humanidades, Año 11, Nº. 33, 2004, pags. 21-43
 Una izquierda antinacionalista
 en Archipiélago: Cuadernos de crítica de la cultura, Nº 45, 2001, pags. 40-41
 La crisis de la democracia en el País Vasco
 en Revista de Occidente, Nº 241, 2001, pags. 114-133
 La ruptura de la tregua de ETA
 Claves de la razón práctica, Nº 100, 2000, pags. 22-30
 Los orígenes estéticos de las identidades modernas
 en Claves de la razón práctica, Nº 80, 1998, pags. 6-13
 A propósito de la estética de la provocación
 junto a Mikel Iriondo, en Recerca: revista de pensament i analisi, Nº. 5, 1995, pags. 193-204
 Esencias de una patria imaginaria: el nacionalismo vasco según Sabino Arana
 en Claves de la razón práctica, Nº 43, 1994, pags. 44-55
 El artista como personaje y la unicidad del arte: el enfrentamiento Oteiza-Chillida
 en Claves de la razón práctica, Nº 8, 1990, pags. 63-66

External links 
 Carlos Martinez Gorriarán
 

Recipients of the Order of Constitutional Merit
Living people
Union, Progress and Democracy politicians
Members of the 10th Congress of Deputies (Spain)
1959 births
People from San Sebastián
University of the Basque Country alumni
University of Deusto alumni
Academic staff of the University of the Basque Country